Jules Timothy Weisberg (born January 1, 1943) is an American flutist, vocalist, and record producer.

Career
In school he wanted to play drums, but instruments were chosen in order of the students' last names, and when Weisberg got his chance, his choice was bassoon or flute. He chose the latter because it was easier to carry and seemed easier to learn. He was a fan of soul music, which had been using the flute in the 1960s. He studied classical music before playing soul, jazz, and pop. His first experience recording was on The Monkees' album The Monkees Present in 1969.

While working as a studio musician, his debut album was released with a version of "Nights in White Satin" by The Moody Blues. In 1972 he recorded with The Carpenters and two years later appeared on the television programs The Midnight Special and Don Kirshner's Rock Concert. His song "A Hard Way to Go" appeared in Woody Allen's movie Annie Hall. He had a hit song, "The Power of Gold", on Twin Sons of Different Mothers (1978), an album recorded with Dan Fogelberg. They collaborated again in 1995 on No Resemblance Whatsoever. Weisberg sued Fogelberg in 1997 for alleged breach of contract and fraud.

Weisberg has performed with David Benoit, Dave Mason, David Arkenstone, and Eddie Rabbitt.

Other appearances
 He appeared on the TV show, The Midnight Special, hosted by Bobby Womack (Season 2, Episode 42), on July 12, 1974.
 He appeared in an ABC TV interview with Dan Fogelberg, in which they discuss their collaboration for the No Resemblance Whatsoever album.

Performances
 Winter Park Jazz Festival, Winter Park, Colorado, July 19, 1998.
 Bonnie Raitt - Tim Weisberg concert at Greek Theatre, University of California, Berkeley, September 14, 1980.
Tom Waits opened for a concert by Tim Weisberg at Ebbett's Field, Denver Colorado, May 17–19, 1973
 Monterey Jazz Festival, Monterey, California, 1970

Awards and honors
 Twin Sons of Different Mothers was Certified Platinum by RIAA.

Discography
 Tim Weisberg (A&M, 1971)
 Hurtwood Edge (A&M, 1972)
 Dreamspeaker (A&M, 1973)
 4 (A&M, 1974)
 Listen to the City (A&M, 1975)
 Live at Last! (A&M, 1976)
 The Tim Weisberg Band (United Artists, 1977)
 Rotations (United Artists, 1978)
 Twin Sons of Different Mothers with Dan Fogelberg (Full Moon/Epic, 1978)
 The Best of Tim Weisberg: Smile! (A&M 1979)
 The Tip of the Weisberg (Nautilus, 1979)
 Night-Rider! (MCA, 1979)
 Party of One (MCA, 1980)
 Travelin' Light (MCA, 1981)
 High Risk (Cypress, 1985)
 Outrageous Temptations (Cypress, 1989)
 Naked Eyes (Fahrenheit, 1994)
 No Resemblance Whatsoever with Dan Fogelberg (Giant, 1995)
 Undercover (Fahrenheit, 1997)
 Time Traveler: A Three Decade Journey (Fahrenheit, 1999)
 Another Byte (DreamSpeaker Music, 2015)

As guest
With David Benoit
 Digits (Bluemoon 1990)
 Lost and Found (Rhino, 1994)
 Fuzzy Logic (GRP, 2002)
 Full Circle (Peak, 2006)
 Earthglow (Heads Up, 2010)
 Conversation (Heads Up, 2012)
 2 in Love (Concord, 2015)

With others
 The Carpenters, A Song for You (A&M, 1972)
 Dan Fogelberg, Nether Lands (Epic, 1977)
 Dan Fogelberg, Live: Greetings from the West (Epic, 1991)
 Lani Hall, Sun Down Lady (A&M, 1972)
 Paul Horn, Paul Horn & the Concert Ensemble (Ovation, 1970)
 Inner Circle, Ready for the World (Capitol, 1977)
 Dave Mason, Dave Mason (CBS, 1974)
 The Monkees, The Monkees Present (Rhino, 1994)
 Pousette-Dart Band, Never Enough (Capitol, 1979)
 Terry Reid, Seed of Memory (ABC, 1976)
 David Riordan, Medicine Wheel (Capitol, 1974)
 Daniel Valdez, Mestizo (A&M, 1974)

Singles
 1971 - Long Ago and Far Away/A Hard Way To Go (A&M 1318)
 1972 - Fog and Spice/For Those Who Never Dream (A&M 1330)
 1972 - Our Thing/Thyme Cube (A&M 1397)
 1973 - Killing Me Softly with His Song/Tibetan Silver (A&M 1427)
 1973 - Do Dah/A Night for Crying (A&M 1493)
 1974 - Streak Out/Night for Crying (A&M 1520)
 1975 - Dion Blue/The Visit (A&M 1680)
 1976 - Gonna Fly Now (Theme from Rocky)/Just for Fun (UA XW933)
 1977 - Cascade/Gene Jean (UA XW1083)
 1978 - Every Time I See Your Smile/So Good to Me (UA 1227)
 1978 - (w/Dan Fogelberg) Tell Me to My Face/Hurtwood Alley (Full Moon 50605) also released by: UK/Full Moon, Australia & Netherlands/Epic
 1979 - (w/Dan Fogelberg) The Power of Gold/Lahaina Luna (Full Moon 50606) also released by: UK/Full Moon, Canada & Japan/Epic
 1979 - Midsummer's Dream/Moonchild (MCA 40135)
 1980 - Magic Lady/I'm The Lucky One (MCA 41307)
 1981 - What's Going On/Page One (MCA 51042)
 1981 - Sleepwalk/Paula (MCA 51163)
 1985 - You've Got to Know/Hang Time (Desert Rock 001)

References

External links
Official website

Living people
1943 births
People from Hollywood, Los Angeles
Jazz musicians from California
American jazz flautists
A&M Records artists
Epic Records artists
MCA Records artists